Myronivskyi is an urban-type settlement in Bakhmut Raion, Donetsk Oblast, Ukraine. The population is

References

Urban-type settlements in Bakhmut Raion